Fite is a rural locality (a selo) in Agulsky District, Republic of Dagestan, Russia. The population was 751 as of 2010.

Geography 
Fite is located 18 km east of Tpig (the district's administrative centre) by road. Goa is the nearest rural locality.

References 

Rural localities in Agulsky District